= Profitable house of I. M. Trofimenko =

- Доходный дом И. М. Трофименко
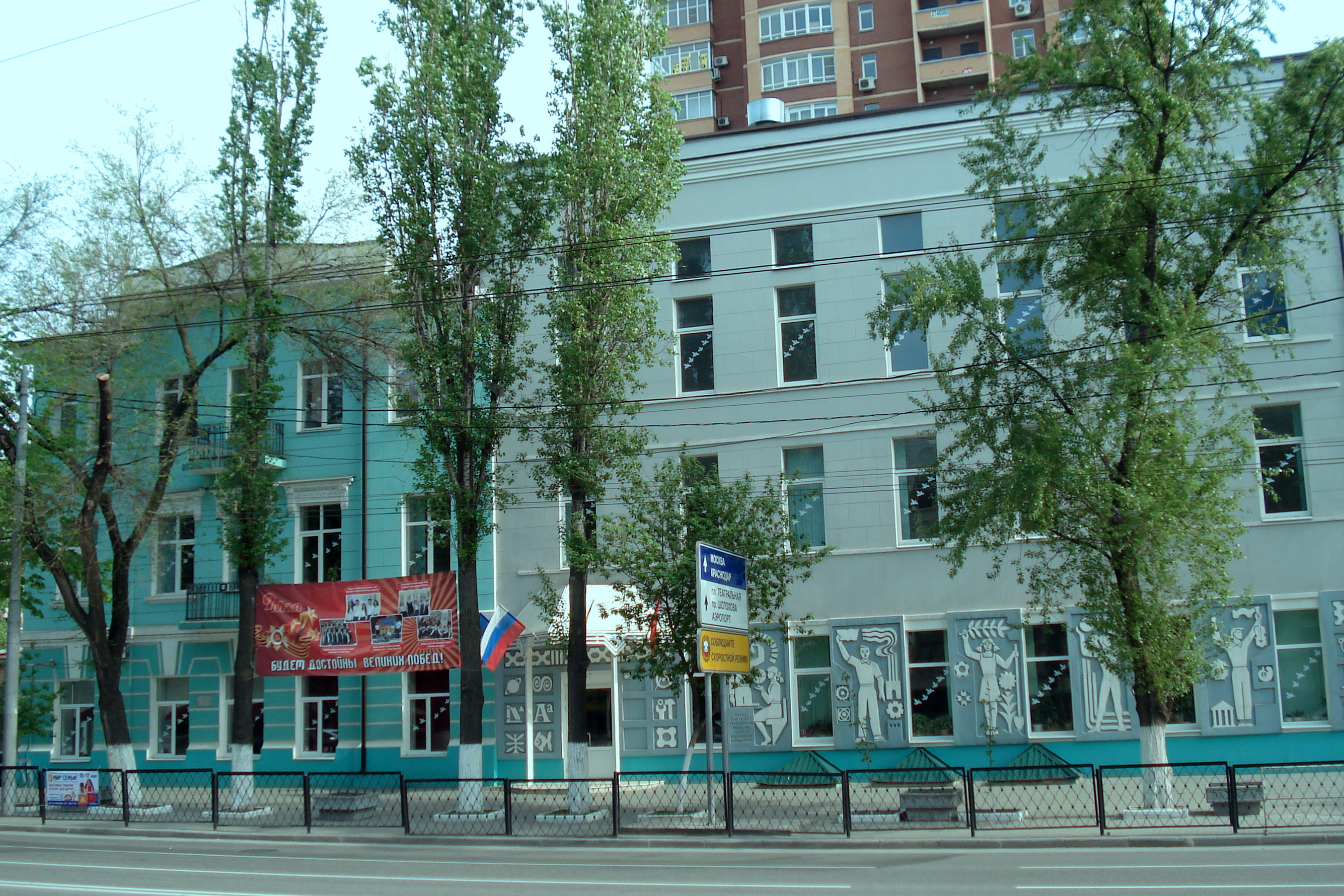
- Interactive map of Profitable house of I. M. Trofimenko
- Location: Rostov-on-Don, Prosveshcheniya Street 73

The Profitable house of I. M. Trofimenko (Russian: Доходный дом И. М. Трофименко) is a mansion built in the beginning of the 20th century in Oktyabrsky district of Rostov-on-Don executed in eclecticism style. It is located at 73 Prosveshcheniya Street. The building is an object of cultural heritage of local value. Originally in the building, the profitable house, then paper-mill with printing house was placed. Nowadays I. M. Trofimenko's house occupies Lyceum № 33 of a name of the Rostov regiment of a national militia.

== History ==
At the beginning of the 20th century, the two-story household located on Prosveshcheniya Street at that time belonged to retired lieutenant Samuel Kipman, the representative of Georges Blok association. The association was engaged in Rostov-on-Don in the sale of bicycles, knitting and sewing machines, weights, arithmometers, cash registers, caskets, etc. In 1909 because of financial difficulties, the company left the market and the house was taken over by sculptor, artist, and schedule Ivan Mikhaylovich Trofimenko. He was the owner of a printing house established on Dmitriyevskaya Street (nowadays Shaumyana). Having got the new building, Trofimenko moved the printing house to his first floor, and placed a paper mill of the Kolorit association on the second. About 30 people worked at the enterprise.

In March 1913, there was the strong fire in the building. The blaze destroyed the entire second floor and roof. All equipment and material of the paper mill became useless: the press, cars, typographical fonts, printing products, and the inventory burned down. The stone walls resisted. All lost property was insured in the Russia and Salamander insurance companies that allowed Trofimenko to not only quickly anew build the building, but also to build on the third floor. After reconstruction revenues of the house, owner increased from 910 to 2580 rubles a year.

Meanwhile, the quickly developing industry of Rostov-on-Don demanded experts in mathematics, physics, and chemistry. In City Council, the issue of opening of the second school in the city was discussed. In February 1914, Duma members considered petitions of 13 house owners suggesting to place this school in Trofimenko's building. The majority of vowels of a thought preferred the new house of Trofimenko, having agreed to pay from the city budget of 7000 rubles a year for rent. A portion of the deputies criticized the place chosen for an educational institution because of its remoteness from the downtown, its proximity to the gvozdilny plant, and because dropouts and workers lived on the premises.
